The Flores cave rat (Spelaeomys florensis) lived on Flores Island, Indonesia.  and Flemming assessed this species to be extinct in 1996, but believed it probably died out before 1500. This specimen is only known from a few subfossil fragments.  It is the only member of the genus Spelaeomys.

References

Old World rats and mice
Extinct rodents
Extinct animals of Indonesia
Extinct mammals of Asia
Holocene extinctions
Mammals described in 1957